Ma Chia-ling (born 21 December 1996 in Kaohsiung, Taiwan) is a Taiwanese singer. She is a member of the Japanese idol girl group AKB48's Team A. She is also the first and so far only member of AKB48 who is not Japanese. Her nickname is "Macharin". Má Ka-lêng is her Hokkien Name.

Career 
Ma debuted on 16 December 2015 at a concert of AKB48. She sang "Heavy Rotation" which was a mix of Japanese and Chinese. On 21 February 2016, she was officially promoted to Team B.

Ma entered the Senbatsu for AKB48's 51st single "Jabaja", which was released on March 14, 2018. She was also the lead performer for the unit  which performed the coupling song "Tomodachi ga Dekita" .

On May 25, 2020, Ma announced her agency transfer from AKS to JPEG, Co. Ltd., as well as the launching of her YouTube channel. In 2022, she later changed her agency to CANVAS, an agency owned by stage production company ILLUMINUS.

Discography

Singles with AKB48

Filmography

Television

References

External links 
 Official profile

1996 births
Living people
AKB48 members
Musicians from Taichung
Taiwanese expatriates in Japan
Taiwanese women singers
Taiwanese idols